Philip Alftberg (born January 19, 1997) is a Swedish collegiate ice hockey defenceman. He is currently playing Division 1 men's ice hockey with St. Lawrence University of the ECAC.

He formerly played professionally in his native Sweden with Brynäs IF of the Swedish Hockey League (SHL). Alftberg made his SHL debut playing with Brynäs IF during the 2014–15 SHL season.

References

External links

1997 births
Living people
Brynäs IF players
Fargo Force players
St. Lawrence Saints men's ice hockey players
Swedish ice hockey defencemen
Tri-City Storm players
Ice hockey people from Stockholm